José António Gregório (born 12 August 1939) is a Portuguese wrestler. He competed in the men's Greco-Roman featherweight at the 1960 Summer Olympics.

References

External links
 

1939 births
Living people
Portuguese male sport wrestlers
Olympic wrestlers of Portugal
Wrestlers at the 1960 Summer Olympics
Sportspeople from Lisbon